The Anderson Packers, also known as the Anderson Duffey Packers and the Chief Anderson Meat Packers, were a professional basketball team based in Anderson, Indiana, in the 1940s and 1950s.

The team was founded and owned by brothers Ike W. and John B. Duffey, founders of meat packing company Duffey's Incorporated, which had purchased the Hughes-Curry Packing Co. of Anderson in 1946, at which time the brothers founded the Anderson Packers. John Duffey was president of the club, and its secretary-treasurer was Ike. The Duffeys profitably sold their Anderson packing plant three years later, although they retained ownership of the team until its demise.

The Packers played in the National Basketball League from 1946 to 1949. The team moved into the National Basketball Association for the 1949–50 season. The franchise withdrew from the NBA on April 11, 1950, when the organization was absorbed by the league.

After that season the team  moved to the National Professional Basketball League, which folded entirely at the end of their only (1950–1951) season.

Season-by-season records

See also 
List of defunct National Basketball Association teams

References

External links
Anderson Packers history and pictures
Anderson Packers Heritage

 
Anderson, Indiana
Basketball teams established in 1946
Basketball teams disestablished in 1951
National Professional Basketball League (1950–51)
1946 establishments in Indiana
1951 disestablishments in Indiana
Defunct National Basketball Association teams